A privy seal is the personal seal of a reigning monarch, used to authenticate official documents of a personal nature, in contrast to a great seal, which is used for documents of greater importance.

Privy Seal of England

The Privy Seal of England can be traced back to the reign of King John. It has been suggested that it was originally the seal that accompanied the person of the Sovereign, while the Great Seal was required to remain in the Chancery. Eventually, the Privy Seal took on a broader function and was replaced by the Signet as the king's personal seal. The Great Seal Act 1884 effectively ended the use of the Privy Seal in England by providing that it was no longer necessary for any instrument to be passed under the Privy Seal.

Privy Seal of Scotland

There is also a separate Privy Seal of Scotland, which existed from at least the reign of Alexander III.

Article XXIV of the Treaty of Union provided that

The Seal was last used in 1898 to execute the commission appointing the Rev. James Cooper to a Regius Chair at the University of Glasgow, but has never been abolished. The office of Keeper of the Privy Seal has not been filled since the death of the Marquess of Breadalbane in 1922.

Privy Seal of Ireland
The "signet or privy seal" of the Kingdom of Ireland was a single seal, whereas in England and Scotland the signet was a separate seal kept by the Clerk of the Signet and Keeper of the Signet respectively. Fiants were issued under the privy seal or signet seal by the Keeper of the Signet or Privy Seal to authorise the issue of letters patent by the Lord Chancellor of Ireland under the Great Seal of Ireland.

Privy Seal of Japan

The Privy Seal of Japan is the official seal of the Emperor of Japan. While it is printed on many state documents, it is separate from the State Seal of Japan. The Privy Seal was made from copper beginning in the Nara period. After the Meiji Restoration, a new seal was made from stone in 1868. The present seal was made from gold in 1874.

The Seal has been kept by the Chamberlain of Japan since 1945, when the office of Lord Keeper of the Privy Seal was abolished. The Lord Keeper was a personal adviser to the Emperor, a position adapted in 1885 from the earlier post of Naidaijin.

References

Seals (insignia)
Government of England
English law
Government of Scotland
Scots law
British monarchy
Government of the United Kingdom
Constitution of the United Kingdom